Sharon Female College was a female seminary, founded in 1837 in Sharon, Mississippi.

When the school was first created, it was run by Methodist, Presbyterian, and Baptist churches.  It comprised a school for men; Sharon College, and a school for women; Sharon Female Academy.  By 1843 Sharon College had closed down and the school was under the control of the Mississippi Conference of the Methodist Episcopal Church.  It was reincorporated as "Sharon Female College" in February, 1846.  The school averaged over 90 students per year, but most did not graduate.

The college survived the Civil War, but declined quickly after the war ended due to the economic stresses that had been put on the region.  Its last class, of only three students, graduated in the Spring of 1872.  By the end of 1873 the college had closed its doors.

See also
 Women's colleges in the United States
 Timeline of women's colleges in the United States

References

Defunct private universities and colleges in Mississippi
Former women's universities and colleges in the United States
Educational institutions established in 1837
Female seminaries in the United States
Education in Madison County, Mississippi
Educational institutions disestablished in 1873
History of women in Mississippi
1837 establishments in Mississippi